Nicholas Simon O'Hern (born 18 October 1971) is an Australian professional golfer.

O'Hern has played on both of the world's premier professional golf tours, the European Tour, and the United States-based PGA Tour. His biggest successes though, have come at home on the PGA Tour of Australasia, where he won the Order of Merit as the leading money winner in 2006.

Personal life
O'Hern was born in Perth, Western Australia. His father was a three-handicap golfer who played baseball for Australia, and he followed him by playing baseball for Western Australia. He was also a talented tennis player, but he chose to concentrate on golf. In 2009, he was named the Number 1 Ticket Holder for the Fremantle Football Club. O'Hern has a wife and two daughters. He currently resides in Melbourne, Australia. He has published his book "Tour Mentality: Inside the Mind of a Golf Pro" in 2016.

Career
O'Hern took up golf at the age of nine and plays left-handed. He turned professional in 1994. He was successful at the European Tour qualifying school at his first attempt in 1998 and played regularly on the European Tour from 1999 through 2007. He has not won on the European Tour, but had two second-place finishes in 2003, two more in 2004 and one each in 2005, 2006 and 2007.

In 2005, O'Hern began to play quite regularly in the United States. He was not a member of the PGA Tour, but having reached the top twenty of the Official World Golf Rankings, he received a substantial number of invitations and sponsors exemptions for PGA Tour events. In 2006 he became a member of the PGA Tour on the basis of his membership of the International Team at the 2005 Presidents Cup, and has since played mostly on that tour.

Also in 2006, O'Hern won the Australian PGA Championship, after he holed out from the greenside bunker for birdie on the fourth hole of a two-man play-off with Peter Lonard. The win brought to an end a seven-year drought for O'Hern, and propelled him to the top of the PGA Tour of Australasia's Order of Merit for 2006. He has won five tournaments in Australia, and continues to play on the PGA Tour of Australasia during the northern hemisphere winter.

O'Hern has featured in the top 20 of the Official World Golf Rankings, and he is the only player who has beaten Tiger Woods in matchplay more than once. He is coached by Neil Simpson of the Mount Lawley Golf Club in Perth, Western Australia.

Knee surgery ended O'Hern's 2010 season after 11 events. He started the 2011 season on a medical exemption. O'Hern satisfied his medical exemption in May 2011 with four events remaining to retain his PGA Tour status. On 6 June, O'Hern went through sectional qualifying and secured a spot in the 2011 U.S. Open.

O'Hern has never won on the PGA Tour; his best finish is a tie for second at the 2006 Booz Allen Classic.

Ball marking
O'Hern's ball marking has become famous because of its originality. In an ode to his native Australia, O'Hern marks his Titleist Pro V1 with a drawn-on kangaroo. The marking has been featured in Titleist advertisements.

Amateur wins
1991 Mount Lawley Championship

Professional wins (6)

PGA Tour of Australasia wins (2)

*Note: The 199 Schweppes Coolum Classic was shortened to 54 holes due to rain.

PGA Tour of Australasia playoff record (1–1)

Other wins (4)
1997 Port Hedland PGA Classic
1998 Port Hedland PGA Classic, South West Open
1999 Nedlands Masters

Playoff record
European Tour playoff record (0–1)

Results in major championships

CUT = missed the half-way cut
"T" = tied

Summary

Most consecutive cuts made – 4 (2004 PGA – 2005 Open Championship)
Longest streak of top-10s – 1

Results in The Players Championship

CUT = missed the halfway cut
"T" indicates a tie for a place

Results in World Golf Championships

1Cancelled due to 9/11

QF, R16, R32, R64 = Round in which player lost in match play
"T" = Tied
NT = No tournament
Note that the HSBC Champions did not become a WGC event until 2009.

Team appearances
Alfred Dunhill Cup (representing Australia): 2000
World Cup (representing Australia): 2004, 2007
Presidents Cup (International team): 2005, 2007

References

External links

Australian male golfers
PGA Tour of Australasia golfers
European Tour golfers
PGA Tour golfers
Left-handed golfers
Golfers from Perth, Western Australia
1971 births
Living people